Francis Leo S. "Lebron" Lopez (born May 17, 2003) is a Filipino-Angolan college basketball player for the UP Fighting Maroons of the University Athletic Association of the Philippines (UAAP). After breaking out in the Philippine high school basketball scene, he was set to play in the Overtime Elite (OTE) league, but due to visa issues, never got to play there. Instead, he committed to play for UP.

High school career 
Lopez first played varsity basketball for Augustinian Abbey School (AAS) at 13 years old. He also continued growing in height, from 5'3" when he 10 years old, to 6'3" at 13 years of age. He then gained significant attention after starring for Las Piñas in the 2018 edition of NCR Palaro, an annual sporting competition for youth from all over Metro Manila, where they just missed the medal rounds.

La Salle Green Hills 
LSGH assistant coach and scout Anton Brodett recruited Lopez to play for La Salle Green Hills (LSGH) after seeing him play in a neighborhood basketball court in Las Piñas. However, he averaged 2.3 points and 1.3 rebounds in 3.4 minutes, seeing action in only 10 of their 22 games in all. He was also set to play in the NCAA Season 94 Shooting Stars competition, but didn't get to compete and was replaced by Sebastian Locsin. LSGH went on to finish as runner-ups to Mapúa for Season 94.

Ateneo de Manila 
After Season 94, LSGH underwent changes in management. That, and talks with Ateneo assistant coach Ford Arao, prompted Lopez to transfer to Ateneo de Manila.

Lopez debuted in Season 82 with 14 points and seven rebounds in a win over the Adamson Baby Falcons. In their first loss of the season, which was against the FEU Baby Tamaraws, he had 18 points, 14 boards, and five blocks. Ateneo bounced back with a win over the UPIS Junior Maroons, in which he had 20 points and three blocks. He then had a double-double of 17 points and 18 rebounds over the UST Tiger Cubs. At the end of the first round of eliminations, he was fifth in the MVP race as Ateneo had a record of 4–3. Against the NSNU Bullpups, he had 17 points, nine rebounds, and five blocks, but missed a go-ahead dunk that eventually led to a close loss. At the end of eliminations, he was third in the MVP race as Ateneo went on to clinch the 3rd seed. However, they lost in the first round of the playoffs to Adamson. He was awarded a spot on the UAAP Juniors Mythical Team at the end of the season, and finished with averages of 16.0 points on 45% shooting, 9.2 rebounds and 3.0 blocks.

In 2020, Lopez made it to the NBTC 24, a list of the top high school basketball players in the country. He was named among the 2020 SLAM Philippines Rising Stars. Two years later, he got to play in the SLAM Rising Stars Classic.

Failed stint with Overtime Elite 
On July 13, 2021, Lopez signed with the Overtime Elite basketball league. However, he never got to join the league, as his visa was constantly rejected by the US Citizenship and Immigration Services (USCIS). He only received $25,000 of his $100,000 deal but it was for the use of his image and likeness in the promotional materials of OTE. He then spent time with the Philippines' men's national team and attempted to play for the Illawarra Hawks in the NBL, but due to his Filipino-Angolan heritage, did not qualify as an Asian import.

College career

UP Fighting Maroons 
For the next phase of his basketball career, it was expected that Lopez would either play overseas or play for the Ateneo Blue Eagles. On January 21, 2023, on the night Ateneo was celebrating its Season 85 basketball championship with a bonfire, it was reported that Lopez had committed to playing for the UP Fighting Maroons. Aside from his family and friends, he also credited UP star player and Gilas teammate Carl Tamayo for helping him in his decision. His former agency also released a letter saying that since he didn't attain a US visa, his contract with them is considered void ab initio (void from start), clarifying eligibility concerns.

National team career

Junior national team 
In 2019, Lopez was named to the Gilas U-19 team for the 2019 FIBA Under-16 Asian Championship.

Senior national team 
In 2021, Lopez made his senior national team debut against Indonesia in the third window of the 2022 Fiba Asia Cup qualifiers. He contributed eight points and five rebounds in just nine minutes as Gilas beat Indonesia. That year, he was the final cut of the team before Gilas competed in the Olympic Qualifying Tournament.

In 2022, Lopez joined Gilas Pilipinas for that year's Southeast Asian Games. On his 19th birthday, he had 17 points, five rebounds, two blocks, and a plus-minus rating of 23 in a win over Cambodia. He followed it up with 18 points on 7-for-7 in a win over Malaysia. They were on the verge of sweeping the tournament until they lost to Indonesia in the finals, settling for a silver medal. Later that year, he played in both the 2023 FIBA World Cup qualifiers and the FIBA Asia Cup.

Personal life 
Lopez is the son of a Filipino father and an Angolan mother. He got his nickname "LeBron" from his family and friends, as he was the tallest in their neighborhood. He also looks up to NBA superstar LeBron James.

Lopez has supported Bongbong Marcos' and Sara Duterte's presidential and vice presidential campaigns respectively as he joined the BBM-Sara Celebrity All-Star Game to help undecided voters.

References

External links 
 Profile at FIBA website
 Profile at RealGM website

2003 births
Living people
Angolan men's basketball players
Citizens of the Philippines through descent
Competitors at the 2021 Southeast Asian Games
Filipino men's basketball players
Filipino people of Angolan descent
Philippines men's national basketball team players
Southeast Asian Games medalists in basketball
Southeast Asian Games silver medalists for the Philippines
Shooting guards
Small forwards